João Gabriel may refer to:
 João Gabriel (footballer, born 1989), João Gabriel Farinello Rosa, Brazilian football centre-back
 João Gabriel (footballer, born 1996), João Gabriel Ramos de Souza, Brazilian football forward